Talamanca is a canton in the Limón province of Costa Rica. The head city is Bribri, located in Bratsi district.

History 

Talamanca was created on 20 May 1969 by decree 4339.

Geography 
Talamanca has an area of  km² and a mean elevation of  metres.

The county is noted for its beautiful beaches, especially in Cahuita and Puerto Viejo, which are popular tourist locations.

Talamanca contains one of Costa Rica's three official border-crossing points with Panamá, the Sixaola-Guabito crossing.

Districts 
The canton of Talamanca is subdivided into the following districts:
 Bratsi
 Sixaola
 Cahuita
 Telire

Demographics 

For the 2011 census, Talamanca had a population of  inhabitants.

The county suffers from pervasive poverty. As of 2009, its human-development index is the lowest-ranked of all Costa Rican cantons. While its most recent infant mortality rate is 12.89% (2009), it was as high as 22.5% (2003), and stayed above 15% between 2003 and 2007. As of 2010, 52.3% of Talamanca inhabitants have access to sanitation (either piped or septic tank), and 75.2% are connected to electricity.

The county is composed of four districts (see graphic below), with its capital city, Bribrí, located in the Bratsi district. Talamanca houses the largest indigenous population in the country (at 11,062, or 34% of the county's population), which is composed principally of the Bribri and Cabécar groups (who in turn represent two of Costa Rica's eight distinct indigenous groups). 31% of the district covers Talamanca's four indigenous reserves (Kekoldi, Talamanca Bribrí, Talamanca Cabécar, and Telire);

Transportation

Road transportation 
The canton is covered by the following road routes:

Conservation
Eighty-eight percent of Talamanca's territory is protected. Fifty-five percent of this land falls under the Chirripó, Amistad, and Cahuita National Parks;  and 2% belongs to the Jairo Mora Sandoval Gandoca-Manzanillo Mixed Wildlife Refuge (a major sea turtle nesting ground).

In defense of these areas, for example, on July 27, 2011, the Ministerio de Ambiente, Energía y Telecomunicaciones (Minaet) carried out the demolition of two hotels (Las Palmas and Suerre), due to their occupation of 4 hectares of land within the Jairo Mora Sandoval Gandoca-Manzanillo Mixed Wildlife Refuge.

See also 
 Talamancan mythology

References 

Cantons of Limón Province
Populated places in Limón Province